Philip Toll Hill Jr. (April 20, 1927 – August 28, 2008) was an American automobile racing driver. He was one of two American drivers to win the Formula One World Drivers' Championship, and the only one who was born in the United States (the other, Mario Andretti, was born in Italy and later became an American citizen). He also scored three wins at each of the 24 Hours of Le Mans and 12 Hours of Sebring sports car races.

Hill was described as a "thoughtful, gentle man" and once said, "I'm in the wrong business. I don't want to beat anybody, I don't want to be the big hero. I'm a peace-loving man, basically."

Career
Born April 20, 1927, in Miami, Florida, Hill was raised in Santa Monica, California, where he lived until his death. He studied business administration at the University of Southern California from 1945 to 1947, where he was a member of the Kappa Sigma fraternity. Hill left early to pursue auto racing, working as a mechanic on other drivers' cars. Hill began racing cars at an early age, going to England as a Jaguar trainee in 1949 and signing with Enzo Ferrari's team in 1956. He made his debut in the French Grand Prix at Reims France in 1958 driving a Maserati. That same year, paired with Belgian teammate Olivier Gendebien, Hill became the first American-born winner of the 24 Hours of Le Mans with Hill driving most of the night in horrific rainy conditions. He and Gendebien would go on to win the endurance race again in 1961 and 1962.

Hill began driving full-time for the Ferrari Formula One team in 1959, earning three podium finishes and fourth place in the Drivers' Championship. In 1960 he won the Italian Grand Prix at Monza, the first Grand Prix win for an American driver in nearly forty years (except the Indianapolis 500, once part of Grand Prix World Championship series), since Jimmy Murphy won the 1921 French Grand Prix. This also turned out to be the last win for a front-engined car in Formula 1. The following season, Hill won the Belgian Grand Prix and with two races left trailed only his Ferrari teammate Wolfgang von Trips in the season standings. A crash during the Italian Grand Prix killed von Trips and fifteen spectators. Hill won the race and clinched the championship but the triumph was bittersweet. Ferrari's decision not to travel to America for the season's final round deprived Hill of the opportunity to participate in his home race at Watkins Glen as the newly crowned World Champion. When he returned for the following season, his last with Ferrari, Hill said, "I no longer have as much need to race, to win. I don't have as much hunger anymore. I am no longer willing to risk killing myself."

After leaving Ferrari at the end of 1962, he and fellow driver Giancarlo Baghetti started for the new team ATS created by ex-Ferrari engineers in the great walkout of 1961. In 1964 Hill continued in Formula One, driving for the Cooper Formula One Team before retiring from single-seaters at the end of the season and limiting his future driving to sports car racing with Ford Motor Company and the Chaparral Cars of Jim Hall. During the 1966 Formula One season, Hill often participated in race weekends behind the wheel of a Ford GT40 prototype, accompanied by a remote-control Panasonic camera in order to produce images for the movie Grand Prix. In that same season, he entered his last Formula One race, the Italian Grand Prix at Monza, racing for Dan Gurney's All American Racers, but he failed to qualify. Hill retired from racing altogether in 1967.

Hill has the distinction of having won the first (a three-lap event at Carrell Speedway in a MG TC on July 24, 1949) and last races of his driving career, the final victory driving for Chaparral in the BOAC 500 at Brands Hatch in England in 1967.

Hill also drove an experimental MG, EX-181, at Bonneville Salt Flats. The "Roaring Raindrop" had a 91-cubic-inch (1.5 L) supercharged MGA twin cam engine, using 86% methanol with nitrobenzene, acetone, and sulphuric ether, for an output of 290 HP. In 1959 Hill attained 257 mph in this car, breaking the previous record of Stirling Moss in the same car, 246 mph.

Hill appeared as himself on the December 11, 1961, episode of the game show To Tell the Truth. He received none of four possible votes.

After racing
Following his retirement, Hill built up an award-winning classic car restoration business in the 1970s called Hill & Vaughn with business partner Ken Vaughn, until they sold the partnership to Jordanian Raja Gargour and Vaughn went on to run a separate business on his own in 1984. Hill remained with Gargour at Hill & Vaughn until the sale of the business again in 1995. Hill also worked as a television commentator for ABC's Wide World of Sports.

Hill had a long association with Road & Track magazine. He wrote several articles for them, including road tests and retrospective articles on historic cars and races. He shared his "grand old man" status at R&T with 1960s racing rival Paul Frère, who also died in 2008.

Hill, in his last years, devoted his time to his vintage car collection and judged at the Pebble Beach Concours d'Elegance more often than any other individual; 2007 was the 40th time he had judged the event.

Hill was married to Alma, and had three children: Derek, Vanessa and Jennifer. Derek raced in International Formula 3000 in 2001, 2002 and 2003, but was forced to retire when Phil became ill with Parkinson's disease.

After traveling to the Monterey Historic Automobile Races in August 2008, Hill was taken to Community Hospital of the Monterey Peninsula, where he died after a short illness from complications of Parkinson's disease in Monterey, California, on August 28. Inside Track, a three-volume book set came out at the tail end of 2017 covering the life and career of Phil Hill. It's a work that had started before his death.

Turn 9 of the CW13 configuration of Buttonwillow Raceway Park is named after Hill.

Racing record

Complete Formula One World Championship results 
(key) (Races in bold indicate pole position; races in italics indicate fastest lap)

1The M3A, fitted with a cine camera, was allowed to enter the race to capture the start for the film Grand Prix

Non-championship Formula One results 
(key)

Complete 24 Hours of Le Mans results

Complete 12 Hours of Sebring results

Complete 24 Hours of Daytona results

Complete Tasman Series results
(key)

Awards
In 1991, he was inducted into the International Motorsports Hall of Fame.
He was inducted in the Motorsports Hall of Fame of America as the sole sports cars driver in the inaugural 1989 class.

Primary career victories : 
24 Hours of Le Mans (3) : 1958, 1961, 1962
12 Hours of Sebring (4) : 1955 (3.0 class), 1958, 1959, 1961
1000 km Buenos Aires (3) : 1956 (S+3.0 class), 1958, 1960
1000 km Nürburgring (2) : 1962, 1966
F1 Italian Grand Prix (2) : 1960, 1961
F1 Belgian Grand Prix (1) : 1961
BOAC 500 (Brands Hatch) (1) : 1967
Targa Florio (1) : 1960 (3.0 class)
Road America 500 (2) : 1955, 1957
Continental Tire Monterey Grand Prix (3) : 1950, 1953, 1955
Los Angeles Times Grand Prix (1) : 1959
Swedish Grand Prix (1) : 1956
 2000 km Daytona (1) : 1964

Notes

References
 Daley, Robert. The Cruel Sport. Prentice-Hall, Inc., 1963.

External links
 The Official Web Site of Phil Hill
 Phil Hill's World Championship Season, Race-by-race
 Phill Hill statistics
 Death of Phil Hill
 Formula One tribute to Phil Hill
 Sports Illustrated cover, March 16, 1959: Sports Car Driver of the Year
 Phil Hill at the 24h of Le Mans
 

American Formula One drivers
Ferrari Formula One drivers
Formula One World Drivers' Champions
Formula One race winners
Ecurie Bonnier Formula One drivers
Automobili Turismo e Sport Formula One drivers
British Racing Partnership Formula One drivers
Scuderia Filipinetti Formula One drivers
Cooper Formula One drivers
Anglo American Racers Formula One drivers
Tasman Series drivers
24 Hours of Le Mans drivers
24 Hours of Le Mans winning drivers
12 Hours of Reims drivers
World Sportscar Championship drivers
International Motorsports Hall of Fame inductees
Racing drivers from Miami
Racing drivers from California
Sportspeople from Santa Monica, California
Marshall School of Business alumni
Deaths from Parkinson's disease
Burials at Woodlawn Memorial Cemetery, Santa Monica
Bonneville 200 MPH Club members
1927 births
2008 deaths
12 Hours of Sebring drivers
Neurological disease deaths in California
Carrera Panamericana drivers